Donald Arthur Gehrmann (November 16, 1927 – July 23, 2022) was an American middle-distance runner. He competed in the 1500 m final at the 1948 Olympics and placed eighth among twelve contenders. Gehrmann won the NCAA 1500 m or mile title in 1948–50. He also won the AAU indoor 1000 yd title in 1952 and 1953; outdoors he placed third in 1947 in the mile.

References

External links

 

1927 births
2022 deaths
Athletes (track and field) at the 1948 Summer Olympics
American male middle-distance runners
Olympic track and field athletes of the United States
Track and field athletes from Milwaukee
20th-century American people